The Regional Council of Trentino-Alto Adige is the legislative assembly of the autonomous region of Trentino-Alto Adige.

The assembly was elected for the first time in 1948. It meets alternately in Trento and Bolzano.

Composition
The Regional Council of Trentino-Alto Adige is composed of 35 members of the Provincial Council of Trento and of 35 members of the Provincial Council of Bolzano.

For the first half of the term the President of the Regional Council is elected among the members of the Italian-speaking group, for the second among those in the German language. Alternatively, a councillor belonging to the Ladin language group may be elected as President, with the consensus of the majority of the group that will have to renounce it.

Political groups

The Regional Council of Trentino-Alto Adige is currently composed of the following political groups:

See also
Landtag of South Tyrol
Politics of Trentino-Alto Adige/Südtirol
Regional council

References

External links
Regional Council of Trentino-Alto Adige

Italian Regional Councils
Trentino-Alto Adige
Politics of Trentino-Alto Adige/Südtirol